Galinthias meruensis is a species of praying mantis found in Kenya, Malawi, Somalia, and Tanzania.

See also
List of mantis genera and species

References

Galinthiadidae
Mantodea of Africa
Insects of Kenya
Insects of Malawi
Insects of Somalia
Insects of Tanzania
Insects described in 1909